Anna Kotchneva (born January 25, 1970) is a former Soviet rhythmic gymnast.

Career 
Kotchneva is the 1987 World Champion in clubs, (tied with Bianka Panova), the 1987 World bronze medalist in the hoop, and the 1987 World co-bronze medalist in the rope with Marina Lobatch.

Kotchneva is married to former artistic gymnast and Olympic gold medallist, Valeri Liukin. Their daughter, Nastia Liukin, is a retired United States artistic gymnast who won 5 medals at the 2008 Beijing Olympics, including the all-around gold.

References

External links
 1987 World Championships Results
 

1970 births
Living people
Soviet rhythmic gymnasts
Russian emigrants to the United States
Liukin family
Medalists at the Rhythmic Gymnastics World Championships
Gymnasts from Moscow
People from Parker, Texas
People with acquired American citizenship